Smoke Creek (also known as Da-deo-da-na-suk-to ("bend in the shore"), Smoke's Creek or Smokes Creek) is a small stream in Erie County, New York. It originates southwest of East Aurora and flows into Lake Erie at Lackawanna. A left tributary is the South Branch Smoke Creek.

The creek is named after "Old Smoke," the English name for Sayenqueraghta, a prominent Seneca chief.

Water quality
In a 2010 report by the New York State Department of Environmental Conservation (DEC), Smoke Creek was found to have "slightly impacted water quality conditions" primarily caused by "past industrial activities and discharges including sludge banks along the creek." However, "aquatic life and recreational uses are considered to be fully
supported in the stream."

References

Rivers of New York (state)
Rivers of Erie County, New York
Tributaries of Lake Erie